Josef Polig (born November 9, 1968, in Sterzing/Vipiteno, Italy) is an Italian former Alpine skier.

Biography
He participated in the World Cup from 1988 to 1995 without getting a podium place, but he is among the few skiers who achieved top 10 positions in all five disciplines. He won gold medal in combined at the 1992 Olympics in Albertville.

See also
 Italy national alpine ski team at the Olympics

References

External links
 

1968 births
Living people
Sportspeople from Sterzing
Olympic alpine skiers of Italy
Italian male alpine skiers
Alpine skiers at the 1992 Winter Olympics
Olympic gold medalists for Italy
Germanophone Italian people
Olympic medalists in alpine skiing
Medalists at the 1992 Winter Olympics
Alpine skiers of Fiamme Gialle